"Run Away with Me" is a song recorded by Canadian singer Carly Rae Jepsen for her third studio album, Emotion (2015). It was written by Jepsen, Mattman & Robin, Oscar Holter, Shellback, and Noonie Bao and produced by Mattman & Robin and Shellback.

The track premiered on Spanish radio station Hits FM on 17 June 2015 and was released as the album's second official single on 17 July 2015. "Run Away with Me" was accompanied by a DIY music video filmed by Jepsen's then-partner David Kalani Larkins in Paris, Tokyo and New York City, which also premiered in July 2015. The song was only a minor success in the charts, but received a very positive reception from music critics.

Composition
"Run Away with Me" is written in the key of F major in  time with a tempo of 120 beats per minute.  The song follows a chord progression of B–Dm7–Csus–G7sus, and Jepsen's vocals span from F3 to D5. The song features a prominent saxophone riff in the introduction which later became an internet meme.

Critical reception

"Run Away with Me" received universal acclaim from music critics. Spin magazine referred to "Run Away with Me" as "the best pop song of 2015 yet", "an undeniable hit waiting in the wings for its moment", and a "big, bold, beautiful masterpiece". Paper magazine hailed the song as "just as much the pop perfection that is 'I Really Like You'" and "the perfect anthemic summer jam". USA Today welcomed "Run Away with Me" as "a marked improvement over ['I Really Like You']". Time magazine wrote of the track, "'Run Away With Me' marries euphoric Swedish dance-pop with a pressing nostalgia for your teenage years, a time when the littlest crushes felt like time bombs and a time Jepsen is really, really, really skilled at evoking. In that sense, it’s 'Teenage Dream 2.0', right down to a bridge so catchy she has to repeat it twice".

Rolling Stone ranked "Run Away with Me" at number 49 on their year-end list of the 50 best songs of 2015. Village Voice named "Run Away with Me" the 11th-best single released in 2015 on their annual year-end critics' poll, Pazz & Jop. Pitchfork ranked it at number 36 on their 200 best songs of the decade list, saying that "fueled by a yearning saxophone riff and colossal drums, Jepsen gleefully repeats her heartfelt invitation until the rest of the world melts away. "Over the weekend, we could turn the world to gold," she murmurs with a quiet devotion, letting the image of two gilded lovers linger in the air." Acclaimed Music ranked it as the 7th best song of the year and the 460th best song of all time.

Varietys Rachel Seo named it Jepsen's best song in October 2022, writing that its "galloping beat and soaring chorus is the stuff of every coming-of-age swan song for those whose bildungsromane were written, or re-written, during the [2010s], joining the array of tracks — like Lorde's 'Green Light' or Taylor Swift's 'Style' — that have emerged as frontrunners of music written to express something profound about growing up and falling hard. 'Run Away With Me' feels the same played anywhere at any time of day: transcendent, timeless and completely given over to the feeling, with an intentional disregard of whether that feeling is love or its imitation."

Year-end lists

Decade-end lists

Commercial performance
"Run Away with Me" did not repeat the major commercial success of the previous single and only made a minor impact on the charts. It reached the top 30 in Czech Republic, Slovakia and Scotland, and briefly charted within the top 100 in the UK, Ireland, Canada and Australia.

Music video
The "Run Away with Me" music video was released on 17 July 2015 on Jepsen's YouTube and Vevo channels. It was directed by her then-partner David Kalani Larkins and consists of guerrilla-style footage filmed on three different continents. Larkins accompanied Jepsen on tour, casually filming a personal footage of her, which later developed into creating a music video. The clip pictures the singer in the Place de la République, Place Charles de Gaulle and on the Eiffel Tower in Paris, in Shibuya Crossing and a karaoke bar in Tokyo, and in New York City where she is seen running along the fountain in Columbus Circle and pointing at the Statue of Liberty from a boat in New York Bay. The clip also sees Jepsen in hotel rooms, airports and on public city transport. More footage was filmed in Dublin, London and Toronto, but it wasn't used in the final video.

Live performances

On 1 May 2015, Jepsen performed "Run Away with Me" during a show in Beijing, China. She then performed the song on The Tonight Show with Jimmy Fallon on 19 August 2015 and subsequently at The Today Show on 21 August 2015, the release date of E•MO•TION in the United States. The track was performed as the opening song on Jepsen's 2015–2016 Gimmie Love Tour. In October 2015, Jepsen performed the song during season 11 of Idols South Africa at the Voortrekker Monument in Pretoria.

Track listings
 Digital download (Remixes)
 "Run Away with Me" (ASTR Remix) – 5:33
 "Run Away with Me" (Cyril Hahn Remix) – 4:52
 "Run Away with Me" (Y2K Remix) – 4:28
 "Run Away with Me" (Cardiknox Remix) – 4:21
 "Run Away with Me" (Liam Keegan Remix) – 4:11
 "Run Away with Me" (Velvet Sunrise Remix) – 3:46

 Digital download (Remixes, Pt. 2)
 "Run Away with Me" (Patrick Stump Remix) – 4:10
 "Run Away with Me" (Ayokay Remix) – 3:31
 "Run Away with Me" (EMBRZ Remix) – 4:39

Charts

Certifications

Release history

In popular culture

 This song was used in the tenth episode of the fourth season of Mr. Robot entitled "410 Gone";
 Jepsen re-recorded the song in the fictional Simlish language for The Sims 4: Get Together;
 The song was used as a lip-sync song on the fifth episode of season three of Canada’s Drag Race between contestants Lady Boom Boom and Kimmy Couture.

References

External links

2015 singles
2015 songs
604 Records singles
Schoolboy Records singles
Interscope Records singles
Carly Rae Jepsen songs
Song recordings produced by Mattman & Robin
Song recordings produced by Shellback (record producer)
Songs written by Carly Rae Jepsen
Songs written by Mattias Larsson
Songs written by Noonie Bao
Songs written by Oscar Holter
Songs written by Robin Fredriksson
Songs written by Shellback (record producer)